Whitehouse is a city in Smith County, Texas, United States. The population was 7,660 in the 2010 census, and 8,257 in 2020. It is part of the Tyler, Texas, metropolitan statistical area.

History

Early history

  The community was founded long before the city was officially incorporated by James Calhoun Hill (auctioneer in 1846 for Tyler land grants).  The community was named in 1845, but was not incorporated until 1953.  The school district (WISD) preceded incorporated municipal government, and was largely responsible for the eventual formation of the city.

Residents of Whitehouse were predominantly farmers or worked in support of agriculture until transportation innovations following World War II lead to other employment options.  Many streets and subdivisions in the community are named for these early agricultural and commercial leaders.

According to oral tradition, the community was named "Whitehouse" by the railroad engineers who stopped near a white-washed community building during early settlement times.  Several cherished historic resources include the various Works Progress Administration (WPA) projects located within the city.  These projects, typically built with sandstone rockwork, are found throughout the city's historic Town Center.

YesterYear Celebration

Civic leaders established the YesterYear Celebration to educate residents about the community's history and heritage.  The festival is held on the fourth weekend each June and includes activities such as parades, carnivals, historic battle reenactments, pageants, and trade days.

Historic reading

Several works documenting the community's history have been published in the recent past.  Shirley Smith wrote and/or edited several books including Homefolks, a collection of letters from important figures who lived in the community throughout the early 20th century.  The Tri-County Leader published a series of articles by Acker Hanks called "Growing up in Whitehouse."  The articles recounted Mr. Hanks' experience in the community starting in the early 1920s.  The Whitehouse Vision 2020 Comprehensive Plan (see Planning and Development) also included a history section.  This section was based on oral history interviews from prominent Whitehouse residents such at Nancy Shahan Coats, Joe Pat Hagan, Acker Hanks, Gaylon Shackelford, and Richard Waller.  Many of these resources are available at the Whitehouse Community Library.

Geography

Whitehouse is located at  (32.223443, –95.217579). The city is bisected by State Highway 110 and Farm to Market Road 346. The city of Tyler is located approximately seven miles (11 km) to the north, while the city of Troup lies roughly the same distance to the south.

According to the United States Census Bureau, the city has a total area that exceeds , all land. The city's extra territorial jurisdiction includes land surrounding Lake Tyler, a large water body used for drinking water and recreation by East Texas residents.

Climate

The climate in this area is characterized by hot, humid summers and generally mild to cool winters. According to the Köppen Climate Classification system, Whitehouse has a humid subtropical climate, abbreviated "Cfa" on climate maps.

Demographics

As of the 2020 United States census, there were 8,257 people, 2,846 households, and 2,352 families residing in the city.

As of the census of 2000, there were 5,346 people, 1,819 households, and 1,500 families residing in the city. The population density was 1,413.6 people per square mile (546.1/km). There were 1,890 housing units at an average density of 499.8 per square mile (193.1/km). The racial makeup of the city was 93.14% White, 2.47% African American, 0.64% Native American, 0.86% Asian, 1.78% from other races, and 1.12% from two or more races. Hispanic or Latino of any race were 3.98% of the population.

There were 1,819 households, out of which 50.4% had children under the age of 18 living with them, 66.2% were married couples living together, 13.5% had a female householder with no husband present, and 17.5% were non-families. 14.7% of all households were made up of individuals, and 5.3% had someone living alone who was 65 years of age or older. The average household size was 2.88 and the average family size was 3.20.

In the city, the population was spread out, with 32.4% under the age of 18, 7.1% from 18 to 24, 33.1% from 25 to 44, 18.8% from 45 to 64, and 8.5% who were 65 years of age or older. The median age was 32 years. For every 100 females, there were 91.9 males. For every 100 females age 18 and over, there were 84.6 males.

The median income for a household in the city was $46,804, and the median income for a family was $49,393. Males had a median income of $36,891 versus $22,334 for females. The per capita income for the city was $17,489. About 6.7% of families and 8.6% of the population were below the poverty line, including 13.5% of those under age 18 and 5.7% of those age 65 or over.

Planning and development

Past efforts

  Whitehouse is in the first phase of an overhaul of its planning regulations.  The city initially began regulating land use through zoning on December 4, 1987.  The next major effort intended to improve quality of life in the city through planning was the completion of the community's first comprehensive plan in April 1996.  The document was developed by J.T. Dunkin & Associates.

Recent efforts

The city's Planning & Zoning Commission has worked at the direction of the City Council to update various components of the 1987 zoning ordinance.  The commission also recommended updates to the subdivision regulations which were adopted in February 2004.  The city also contracted with Butler Planning Services to update the comprehensive plan from 1996.  The firm, along with a citizen steering committee, produced the Whitehouse Vision 2020 Comprehensive Plan in the spring of 2006.  Following this effort, the city is currently evaluating the need for a new zoning ordinance which can implement the recommendations of the Vision 2020 Plan.

Education
  The city is served by the Whitehouse Independent School District.  The district consists of seven schools located on six campuses.  The campuses include: 
 Cain Elementary School
 Mozelle Brown Elementary School
 Higgins Elementary School
 Stanton-Smith Elementary School
 Holloway Middle School
 Whitehouse Junior High School 
 Whitehouse High School
 AIM Center
 Bus Barn

The district is well regarded throughout the East Texas region and is one factor contributing to the city's strong growth rate.  Recognitions for the district include the "One of BScene's Best" award for two straight years.

Stanton-Smith Elementary school is a more recent addition to the Whitehouse ISD campuses. It has been added to meet the needs of population growth within the city, with more efficient classroom space.

References

External links
 City of Whitehouse Website
 City of Whitehouse Vision 2020 Comprehensive Plan
 Chamber of Commerce
 Whitehouse Independent School District
 Handbook of Texas Online

Cities in Smith County, Texas
Cities in Texas